Hrvatin Stjepanić (1299–1304),  was a Bosnian magnate with the title of Knyaz of Donji Kraji in Bosnia (de inferioribus Bosne confinibus. In historiography, Hrvatin's surname is spelled Stjepanić or Stipanić.

Life
Hrvatin Stjepanić was a Bosnian magnate, who ruled in Donji Kraji, in medieval Bosnia with the title of knyaz (de inferioribus Bosne confinibus). He was vassal of Paul I Šubić of Bribir, Ban of Bosnia at the time. Medievalist Ferdo Šišić believed that Hrvatin have died around the same time as Paul I (1312). He had three sons. Hrvatin is a namesake for the Hrvatinić noble family, made prominent in the Banate of Bosnia and later Kingdom of Bosnia by his son, Vukac Hrvatinić, at first as a knyaz and later vojvoda, and even more so by his grandson, the Grand Duke of Bosnia, Hrvoje Vukčić.

Issue
Hrvatin had three sons:

Vukoslav Hrvatinić (fl. 1315–1326), issued a charter in 1315 in Sanica. In ca. 1326, Ban Stjepan II in a land grant mentioned that Vukoslav "had left the Croatian lord". Served as Knyaz of Ključ (fl. 1325). Married Jelena, the daughter of Knyaz Kurjak.
Pavao Hrvatinić (fl. 1323–1332)
Vukac Hrvatinić (fl. 1357–1366), defended the Soko fortress in the Pliva county in ca. 1363 against the Hungarians, for which he was awarded an entire župa Pliva and a title of vojvoda by Ban Tvrtko I.

Sources

References

Hrvatinić noble family
14th-century rulers in Europe
14th-century births
14th-century deaths
People of the Banate of Bosnia